N(6)-Carboxymethyllysine (CML), also known as  N(epsilon)-(carboxymethyl)lysine, is an advanced glycation endproduct (AGE). CML has been the most used marker for AGEs in food analysis.

Recently, it has been demonstrated that  gut microbiota mediates an aging-associated decline in gut barrier function, allowing AGEs to leak into the bloodstream from the gut and impairing microglial function in the brain. It is suggested that the amount of CML in human blood samples may  correlated with age.

References

Amino acid derivatives